House of Football (Budynok futbolu) is a headquarters of the Football Federation of Ukraine located in Kyiv, Ukraine, right next to the Olympiyskiy National Sports Complex.

The construction of the building started back on 15 April 2004. The construction was sponsored by the UEFA program "HatTrick". The opening ceremony of the House of Football on 30 November 2006 attended the former UEFA President Lennart Johansson, President of the Football Federation of Ukraine, Hryhoriy Surkis as well as other important officia

als among which were Leonid Kuchma, Valeriy Pustovoitenko, Leonid Kravchuk, Michel Platini. The building has five floors, four conference halls, restaurant, its own television studio and mini publishing, as well as the museum of the Football History of Ukraine.

Right across the street is located Bannikov Stadium, while in a close proximity there are the Light-Athletics Training Complex "Atlet", the Central Military Clinical Hospital of Ministry of Defense, Kyiv Fortress, the big factory "RADAR", the Kyiv city clinic hospital #17, the National University of Physical Education and Sports.

References

External links
 Григорій СУРКІС: «Ми будуємо «Будинок футболу» (Hryhoriy Surkis, "We are building the House of Football"). www.day.kyiv.ua. 08/23/2000. Accessed 09/26/2012
 ЮХАНССОН И СУРКИС ОТКРЫЛИ В КИЕВЕ ДОМ ФУТБОЛА (Johansson and Surkis opened in Kiev the House of Football). www.football.by. 11/30/2006. Accessed 09/26/2012
 У Києві відкривається Будинок футболу (In Kyiv is opening the House of Football). ua.korrespondent.net. 11/29/2006. Accessed 09/26/2012
 wikimapia.org

House of Football
House of Football
Tourist attractions in Kyiv
Ukrainian Association of Football
Pecherskyi District